Nicholas Charles Palliser Courtney (born 18 July 1967 in Launceston, Tasmania) was an Australian cricketer who played for Tasmania. 

He made his debut against the touring Sri Lankans in the 1987–88 season, and made fairly regular appearances for the Tigers until the 1994–95 season.

See also
 List of Tasmanian representative cricketers

External links
 

1967 births
Living people
Australian cricketers
Tasmania cricketers
Cricketers from Launceston, Tasmania